Rough Range is a location in Western Australia where oil was discovered during an exploration drilling programme in 1953.

West Australian Petroleum (WAPET) drilled its first well at Rough Range near North West Cape in 1953. Despite being abandoned as non-commercial in the mid 1950s, consideration was given in the 2000s to re-work the find.

Notes

Petroleum industry in Western Australia
North West Western Australia